WBQO (93.7 FM) is a radio station licensed to serve the community of Darien, Georgia. The station is owned by QBS Broadcasting, LLC, and airs a news/talk format.

The station was assigned the WBQO call letters by the Federal Communications Commission on June 8, 2015, serving St. Simons Island, Georgia.

WBQO was licensed to change its community of license from St. Simons Island to Darien effective December 21, 2022.

References

External links
 Official Website
 

BQO
Radio stations established in 2015
2015 establishments in Georgia (U.S. state)
News and talk radio stations in the United States
Glynn County, Georgia